New York's 17th State Assembly district is one of the 150 districts in the New York State Assembly. It has been represented by Republican John Mikulin since a special election in 2018.

Geography
District 17 is in Nassau County. It contains portions of the towns of Hempstead and Oyster Bay, including Levittown, Bethpage, Plainedge, North Massepequa and Massapequa.

Recent election results

2022

2020

2018

2018 special

2016

2014

2012

2010

References 

17
Nassau County, New York